École secondaire Sophie-Barat is a Francophone public co-educational secondary school located in the Ahuntsic-Cartierville borough in Montreal, Quebec. Part of the Centre de services scolaire de Montréal (CSSDM), it was originally in the catholic School board Commission des écoles catholiques de Montréal (CECM) before the 1998 reorganization of School boards from religious communities into linguistic communities in Quebec. In 2019, the school has 1,666 students and 115 teachers.

History
This establishment is the oldest of the CSSDM. Between 1856 and 1858, the Dames du Sacré-Coeur erected the Pensionnat du Sacré-Coeur devoted to the young girls of the francophone bourgeoisie. Destroyed by fire in 1929, the building was reconstructed in 1930. In 1970, the building was sold and became the French public secondary mixed school École secondaire Sophie-Barat.

The School
The establishment has four stories and contains mainly regular classrooms, rooms for computer labs, science labs, plastic art workshops, a music room, two canteens, a library and an auditorium. The school also comprises three gymnasiums and a swimming pool.

Programs and services
Besides the regular program, the school offers specialized programs in science, literature, arts and social involvement.

Others professional services are offered to the students: psychoeducator, nurse, social worker, guidance counsellor, sports and leisure technician, special education technician, drug addiction worker, etc.

Student life

Sports
Active girls program
Badminton
Basketball
Cheerleading
Cosom Hockey
Flag Football
Futsal
Handball
Kickboxing
Outdoor Club
Ski trips
Soccer
Volley-ball
Yoga

Culture
Choir
Cooking classes
Hip-Hop
Improvisational Theatre
Latin dances
Photo Club
Pottery
Theatre

Events
Back-to-school Party
Christmas Market
Christmas Party
Cultural trips
Creation Night
Exhibitions
Graduation Ceremonies
Green Classes
Halloween
Hiking trip
Meritas Gala
Movie Festival
Music Festival
Night under the tent
Secondaire en spectacle program
School Prom
Shows
Sophiestival
Sports Gala
Sugar shack trip

Notable students
Simon Cliche-Trudeau, better known under the stage name Loud, French-Canadian rapper
Laurent Fortier-Brassard, better known under the stage name Lary Kidd, French-Canadian rapper

References

External links
 École secondaire Sophie-Barat 
 École secondaire Sophie-Barat  (Archive)

High schools in Montreal